Wuzhou Film Distribution is a Chinese film distribution company owned by Wanda Group.

Filmography

References

Film distributors of China
Dalian Wanda Group